The Ireland women's international rules football team was organised by the Ladies' Gaelic Football Association and represented Ireland in the 2006 Ladies' International Rules Series against Australia. As of 2019, this is the only series the team has  played. Ireland won the series, winning the first test at Breffni Park by 134–15 and the second test at Parnell Park by 39–18.

2006 Series

First test

Second test

2006 squad
In preparation for the 2006 Series, the LGFA and the team manager, Jarlath Burns, held a series of  trials and camps in Mullingar, Cork and Armagh during September and early October. The final squad included eight players who had played in the 2006 All-Ireland Senior Ladies' Football Championship Final. 22 of the 30 strong squad were nominated for the 2006 All Star Awards. The squad featured representatives from 14 different GAA counties and included five senior inter-county captains, including Juliet Murphy, Bronagh O'Donnell, Cora Staunton, Mary Sheridan and Mary O'Donnell.

Manager Jarlath Burns (Armagh) 
First test starting XV Clíodhna O'Connor; Rena Buckley, Angela Walsh, Caoimhe Marley, Aoibheann Daly, Norita Kelly, Patricia Fogarty; Patricia Gleeson, Mary O'Donnell; Sarah O'Connor (c), Bronagh Sheridan, Brianna Leahy, Geraldine Doherty, Mairead Morrissey, Cora Staunton.
Interchange players Sinéad Aherne, Micheala Downey, Christina Heffernan, Anne Marie McDonagh, Lorraine Muckian, Alma O'Donnell, Dympna O'Brien, Bronagh O'Donnell, Caroline O'HanlonMary Sheridan.
Squad players Juliet Murphy, Una Carroll, Grainne Ni Flathartha, Sinéad Dooley, Jackie Shields.

References

 
International rules football teams
2006 establishments in Ireland